The men's horizontal bar competition at the 1952 Summer Olympics was held at Töölö Sports Hall, Exhibition Hall I from 19 to 21 July. It was the eighth appearance of the event. There were 185 competitors from 29 nations, with each nation sending up to 8 gymnasts. The event was won by Jack Günthard of Switzerland, the nation's second consecutive and third overall victory in the horizontal bar, breaking a tie with the United States for most all-time. Switzerland also took one of the silver medals, as Josef Stalder tied with Alfred Schwarzmann of Germany, competing at the age of 40, for second. Stalder and Schwarzmann were the first two men to win multiple horizontal bars medals; Stalder had won the event in 1948 and Schwarzmann had earned bronze in 1936.

Background

This was the eighth appearance of the event, which is one of the five apparatus events held every time there were apparatus events at the Summer Olympics (no apparatus events were held in 1900, 1908, 1912, or 1920). Four of the top 10 gymnasts from 1948 returned: gold medalist Josef Stalder of Switzerland, fourth-place finishers Raymond Dot of France and Lajos Sántha of Hungary, and ninth-place finisher Lajos Tóth of Hungary. 1936 bronze medalist Alfred Schwarzmann of Germany (unable to compete in 1948 due to the exclusion of the World War II aggressor nations) also returned. Hans Eugster of Switzerland was the reigning (1950) world champion; Dot had finished third after Eugster and Olavi Rove of Finland.

Belgium, India, Norway, Poland, Portugal, Saar, South Africa, the Soviet Union, Spain, and Sweden each made their debut in the men's horizontal bar. The United States made its seventh appearance, most of any nation, having missed only the inaugural 1896 Games. Of the 22 different nations that had competed at least once in the event before 1952, 19 competed in Helsinki (only Greece, Mexico, and the Netherlands were missing among the nations having previously competed).

Competition format

The gymnastics format continued to use the aggregation format. Each nation entered a team of between five and eight gymnasts or up to three individual gymnasts. All entrants in the gymnastics competitions performed both a compulsory exercise and a voluntary exercise for each apparatus. The 2 exercise scores were summed to give a total for the apparatus.

No separate finals were contested.

For each exercise, four judges gave scores from 0 to 10 in one-tenth point increments. The top and bottom scores were discarded and the remaining two scores averaged to give the exercise total. Thus, exercise scores ranged from 0 to 10 and apparatus scores from 0 to 20.

The competitor had the option to make a second try only on the compulsory exercise—with the second attempt counting regardless of whether it was better than the first.

Schedule

All times are Eastern European Summer Time (UTC+3)

Results

References

Men's horizontal bar
1952
Men's 1952
Men's events at the 1952 Summer Olympics